The 2021 FIL European Luge Championships were held from 9 to 10 January 2021 in Sigulda, Latvia. This was the fifth time Sigulda hosted the event.

Schedule
Four events were held.

All times are local (UTC+2).

Medal summary

Medal table

Medalists

References

FIL European Luge Championships
 
European Championships
Luge
International luge competitions hosted by Latvia
Sport in Sigulda
FIL